Harring is a surname. Notable people with the surname include:

Harry K. Harring (1871–1928), American zoologist
Laura Harring (born 1964), Mexican actress
Michael Harring (born 1979), American film director
Roger Harring (1932–2021), American football player and coach

See also
Haring